Camilla Andersson  (born 3 July 1967) is a Swedish footballer who played as a midfielder for the Sweden women's national football team. She was part of the team at the 1988 FIFA Women's Invitation Tournament and UEFA Women's Euro 1997. On club level she played for Älvsjö AIK in Sweden.

References

External links
 Sweden player profile

1967 births
Living people
Swedish women's footballers
Sweden women's international footballers
Place of birth missing (living people)
Women's association football midfielders